The Piraeus derby, is an association football and water polo rivalry between Ethnikos Piraeus and Olympiacos, the 2 teams representing the city of Piraeus.

Ethnikos was founded on November 21, 1923 while Olympiacos was founded on March 10, 1925.

Olympiacos has never been relegated in football while Ethnikos has 4 relegations from the first division (1990, 1992, 1996, 1999)

In water polo Olympiacos has never been relegated while Ethnikos has been relegated twice (2009, 2012)

Once a major derby, since Olympiacos' dominance the derby has lost importance over the years, however the rivalry still exists as the poaching of players and the ownership of the stadium still remain a point of contention.

Although the importance of the derby has declined in football, the rivalry is still very much alive in other sports, especially water polo.

History

Football 
Since the two clubs were established in the mid-1920s, Ethnikos' traditional local rival has been Olympiacos CFP, one of the two most popular and successful multi-sport clubs in Greece along with Panathinaikos.

While a legitimate rivalry between Ethnikos and Olympiacos still exists in water polo (Ethnikos Piraeus Water Polo Club has won the most Greek water polo championships of any club, while Olympiacos Water Polo Club has won the second-most), that is no longer the case in football.

Ethnikos and Olympiacos F.C. were more or less evenly matched and had great battles for Piraeus supremacy in the 1920s and 1930s, but thereafter Olympiacos became increasingly more powerful and successful and began to pass Ethnikos by.

In 1956, Olympiacos won the championship with Ethnikos finishing second meaning the first and only time in which the top two positions in the league were occupied by Piraeus's teams. 

One of Ethnikos's most important wins (if not the most important) is the semifinal win in the 1932-33 Greek Cup when he beat Olympiacos 2-1 in a knockout match. 

Ethnikos was relegated in 1990 to the second division, a sad moment for the club who was never relegated since its foundation in 1923. Nevertheless, Olympiacos fans celebrated it.  

Along the way, Olympiacos developed a habit for luring Ethnikos' best players, like Greece men's national football team players Philippos Kourantis in the late 1920s, Giannis Chelmis in the late 1930s and Giannis Ioannou in the early 1950s. This habit continued in the later decades with Christos Arvanitis, Tasos Mitropoulos, Stavros Papadopoulos, Thomas Rohrbach.

In 1956–57 Olympiacos was seemingly behind a scandal that robbed Ethnikos of the national championship. Ethnikos was favorite for the title with 4 matches left in the season, and had the derby with Olympiacos next on the schedule; but before the derby arrived Ethnikos was dubiously disqualified from the competition. With Ethnikos out of the way Olympiacos ultimately took the Championship.

In 1973, Ethnikos lost the great Michalis Kritikopoulos to Olympiacos, just a year before Ethnikos mounted its greatest challenge for the national championship in the modern era; many Ethnikos fans feel that if they still had Kritikopoulos, the team would have managed to hold on to 1st place rather than run out of gas in the second half of the 1974–75 season.

Olympiacos ultimately became the dominant football club in Greece, having won the League and Cup more than any other club, and Ethnikos has not been able to seriously compete with them for decades. Ethnikos has not defeated Olympiacos in a league match since the 1985–86 season and has not finished above Olympiacos in the league standings since the 1987–88 season.

In the 1990s, when Olympiacos was experiencing probably the greatest era of its history while Ethnikos was suffering through what was surely its worst, Ethnikos lost some of its fanbase to Olympiacos.

A recent point of contention for Ethnikos fans has to do with Karaiskakis Stadium. Karaiskakis is the traditional home of both Olympiacos and Ethnikos, but only Olympiacos has played there since the stadium was rebuilt for use in the 2004 Summer Olympics.

Water polo 
Olympiacos and Ethnikos are the greatest clubs in the history of men's Greece water polo. Since their foundation, the two clubs were among the strongest in Greek water polo. Before the start of WW2, Olympiacos had won four championship in contrast to Ethnikos's two. After WW2, both clubs remained a dominant force along with NO Patras, fighting for the title almost every year. From 1945 to 1952, NOP won three titles, Olympiacos four and Ethnikos one. 

In 1953, Ethnikos started a dynasty of almost 40 years claiming 33 championships in 38 years. The Greek cup that started in 1953 was abolished in 1958 due to unprecedented dominance of Ethnikos who had achieved six straight doubles in 1958. Olympiacos had great difficulty in beating rival Ethnikos, let alone winning the championship. Olympiacos managed to beat Ethnikos from 1953 to 1990 only seven times. From 1951 to 1964 and from 1977 to 1990, Ethnikos was unbeaten against Olympiacos. However, Olympiacos managed to get two titles. One was shared with Ethnikos in 1969 because of a suspended final match and the other one came in 1971 when the “reds” managed to take the crown of Ethnikos off after 18 consecutive championships for the “blues”. Hall of famer Ivo Trumbić was the coach of Olympiacos.

Since 1992, Olympiacos has won all championships except for five seasons (1994, 1997, 1998, 2006, 2012) and has won also the LEN Champions League twice in 2002 and 2018. Ethnikos has managed only two championships (1994, 2006) and two cups (2000, 2005). Ethnikos' s last win against Olympiacos came in 2008.

Head to Head

Football 
Olympiacos's biggest win is 5–0 twice (1966, 1968) while Ethnikos's is 4–2 twice (1929, 1939)

Since 1960 and the introduction of A' Ethniki, Olympiakos won 53 times, Ethnikos 4 times and 15 matches ended as a draw.

Last win for Ethnikos is in 1986 in Olympic Stadium (2–0) while Olympiacos's is the last match they played each other in 1999 (0–3 for Olympiacos).

Summary of matches for Greek league and cup

List of matches for the top division

Head to Head in the Greek cup 

1 Ethnikos advanced through the away goals rule

Water polo

Summary of matches

Higher finish in the championship 

 In 2010 and 2013 Ethnikos was playing in the second division while in 1939 he did not compete. On the other hand Olympiacos did not participate in 1926.
 In 1935 both were disqualified and did not compete.
 In 1969 both teams were declared champions.
 Olympiacos finished 44 times higher, Ethnikos 42

List of matches in the A1 Division (Greek championship, 1987–) 
Red: Olympiacos win

Blue: Ethnikos win

List of matches for the Greek Cup

Biggest win

Honours (Football)

Greek Championship honours

Greek Cup honours

Total honour comparison

Honours (Water polo)

Greek Championship honours 

Bold indicates that the year in which the rival team finished second. 

Out of the 35 championships that Olympiacos has won, in 11 (1927, 1933, 1934, 1949, 1952, 1971, 1992, 1995, 2005, 2007, 2008) of them Ethnikos came second. 

Out of the 38 championships that Ethnikos has won, in 20 of them (1953, 1959, 1960, 1963, 1964, 1965, 1966, 1967, 1968, 1970, 1972, 1973, 1974, 1975, 1976, 1977, 1978, 1979, 1994, 2006) Olympiacos came second. 

Ethnikos has the longest streak of winning championships (18 in a row) out of all the other team sports. Specifically, Ethnikos was the champion of Greece from 1953 to 1970. He lost the title in 1971 to Olympiacos but he started a new streak from 1972 to 1985 (14 in a row). Since 1986, the club has won only 3 championships (1988, 1994, 2006). 

Olympiacos had 8 championships already in 1952, when Ethnikos had only 3 but from 1953 to 1991, the club won only 2 titles. Since 1992 the club has dominated the Greek championship with 26 out of the last 31 titles. Right now Olympiacos is on streak of 10 in a row. 

In European level, Ethnikos was the first team to reach the Final-Four of the LEN Champions League in 1980. He finished 4th in Europe. Ethnikos's women's team has 1 European trophy, the 2010 LEN Trophy. The club did not manage to win the LEN Super Cup that year and lost to another Greek club, Vouliagmeni

Olympiacos has been European champion twice in 2002 and 2018. He beat Honvéd in 2002 and Pro Recco in 2018. In both occasions, Olympiacos was crowned champion in the country of the finalist team. The club has been finalist three times (2001, 2016, 2019). Olympiacos also has 1 LEN Super Cup in men's water polo. Olympiacos women's team has been crowned European champions twice (2015, 2021). In addition, the club has two lost finals (2017, 2019) but has won the 2014 LEN Trophy and the 2015 LEN Super Cup.

Olympiacos has finished above Ethnikos in the league 45 times compared to Ethnikos's 42.

In the Greek cup, Ethnikos has 12 trophies, 4 of them, came after beating Olympiacos in the final.

Olympiacos has 23 trophies and has beaten Ethnikos twice.

Greek Cup honours 

Bold indicates that the final was between the two rivals

Total honour comparison

The Piraeus derby in European competition 
In 2021, Olympiacos and Ethnikos hosted the Group F of LEN Euroleague, Europe's most prestigious club competition for women's waterpolo. All matches were held at the Piraeus National Swimming Pool. Both clubs from Piraeus advanced to the quarterfinals of the competition. The first ever “European” Piraeus derby ended 9-5 in favour of Olympiacos. At the end of the season Olympiacos won the LEN Euroleague and Ethnikos the LEN Trophy. The two city clubs will contest the European Super Cup for the 2022 season. It was the first time two clubs from the same city will compete in any team sport for the European Super Cup trophy in Greek sports history. Olympiacos won the match 11–4.

Final standings

References

Greece football derbies
Sport in Piraeus